Stan Smith (17 April 1925 – 8 June 2019) was an Australian rules footballer who played with Collingwood in the Victorian Football League (VFL).		
		
His brother Ron also played for Collingwood.

Notes

External links 

Profile on Collingwood Forever

1925 births
2019 deaths
Australian rules footballers from Victoria (Australia)
Collingwood Football Club players